Randy Rhino (born December 2, 1953) is a former American football player.  After a standout college career at Georgia Tech, he became an all-star defensive back in the Canadian Football League.

Rhino grew up in Charlotte, North Carolina, and led Olympic High School to a state football championship final game.  For college he played for Georgia Tech's Yellow Jackets, where he was a first-team All-American.

He began his pro career in the World Football League (WFL), playing for the Charlotte Hornets in 1975, where he intercepted three passes (one for a touchdown), caught one pass on offense for a touchdown, and returned punts and kickoffs. He intercepted 18 passes and returned them for 404 yards, was an all star twice, and won a Grey Cup in 1977. He joined the Ottawa Rough Riders for one season, 1981, and was again an all star.

In 2002, he was inducted into the College Football Hall of Fame.

See also 
 List of NCAA major college yearly punt and kickoff return leaders

References

External links
Randy Rhino Stats | College-Football at Sports-Reference.com

1953 births
Living people
American football defensive backs
Players of Canadian football from Atlanta
Canadian football defensive backs
Charlotte Hornets (WFL) players
Georgia Tech Yellow Jackets football players
Montreal Alouettes players
Ottawa Rough Riders players
All-American college football players
College Football Hall of Fame inductees
Players of American football from Atlanta